A watchtower is a type of fortification.

Watchtower or Watch Tower may also refer to:

Buildings and structures
 Fire lookout tower, a tower usually located at a high vantage point to see any trace of fire and call for fire suppression
 Observation tower, a stand-alone structure used to view events from a long distance and to create a full 360 degree range of vision
 Watchtower (agricultural), a hut used in the ancient Middle East for watching over farmland and storing harvested produce

Places
 The Watchtower (Alberta), a mountain summit in the Canadian Rockies
 Watch Tower (mountain), a mountain in the Wind River Range, Wyoming, U.S.
 Watchtower, New York, a census-designated place, United States

Arts, entertainment and media
 Watchtower (2001 film)
 Justice League Watchtower, the name of various headquarters of the fictional superhero team "Justice League"
 Watchtower, the codename of the character Chloe Sullivan in the TV series Smallville

Literature
 The Watchtower, a magazine published by Jehovah's Witnesses

Novels
 Watchtower (novel), a 1979 novel in the Chronicles of Tornor series
 The Watch Tower, a 1966 novel by Elizabeth Harrower

Music
 Watchtower (band), an American progressive metal band

Songs
 "Watchtower" (song), a 2012 song by Devlin
 "Watchtower", a 1989 song by The Psychedelic Furs
 "Watchtower", a 1997 song by Echo & the Bunnymen on "Nothing Lasts Forever"
 "Watchtower", a 2007 song by Abigail Williams on Legend

Magic and religion
 Watchtower (magic), a type of guardian spirit
 The Watch Tower Bible and Tract Society of Pennsylvania, a publishing company of Jehovah's Witnesses
 Watchtower movement, a religious and political movement in the Democratic Republic of the Congo

Other uses
 Guadalcanal campaign, codenamed Operation Watchtower, a military campaign fought between 7 August 1942 and 9 February 1943